Luigi Da Corte (born 10 June 1973) is an Italian ice hockey player. He competed in the men's tournament at the 1994 Winter Olympics.

References

External links
 

1973 births
Living people
Asiago Hockey 1935 players
Bolzano HC players
HC Merano players
HC Pustertal Wölfe players
HC Varese players
Ice hockey players at the 1994 Winter Olympics
Olympic ice hockey players of Italy
SG Cortina players
Sportspeople from the Province of Belluno